Zebrawood refers to several trees and the wood derived from them, including:

 Astronium fraxinifolium
 Brachystegia spiciformis
 Centrolobium robustum
 Guettarda speciosa
 Pistacia integerrima, native to Asia